The Herb House is a historic building located in downtown Savannah, Georgia, United States. Some sources claim it to be built in the 18th century (1733 or 1734), which would have made it the oldest extant building in the state of Georgia; however, its construction in local handmade brick puts this in doubt. Other sources give a construction year of 1853, which is the first year it appears on a map. The building is now part of the restaurant Pirates' House, the buildings for which both pre- (1794) and post-date (1871) it.

History
The Herb House was built on a ten-acre plot of land located on the east side of James Oglethorpe's original plan of the city of Savannah. The plot was assigned to become a botanical garden that modeled the Chelsea Botanical Garden in London, England. The garden, which was located beyond the bounds of today's buildings, was dedicated to Oglethorpe's trustees, becoming known as the Trustees' Garden. Oglethorpe recruited botanists from around the world to acquire plants for the project, such as cotton, spices, indigo and medicinal herbs. The garden was hoped to bring success in the wine and silk industries and was centered on growing mulberry trees. The soil and weather conditions of Georgia were not compatible with the mulberry trees and it was not successful with wine or silk; however, it did distribute peach trees, for which Georgia is now renowned. The garden was also highly successful in growing cotton, which later became a staple of Georgia's economy.

The Herb House was built on the plot of land around 1853 to house the gardener who worked there. This building was deemed the Herb House. A hay loft, where the gardener slept, was on the second floor of the building. The front of the first floor was used for tools and gardening supplies, while the rear was stables.

Renovation and ownership
In 1948, Pirates' House and the surrounding land was acquired by The Savannah Gas Company. The building soon caught the interest of Mrs. Hansell Hilyer, wife of the president of the company. She renewed the house museum into the restaurant of the present day.

References

External links
 Official Pirates' House website
 A view of the Herb House from East Broad Street – Google Street View, May 2019

Houses in Savannah, Georgia
Houses completed in 1853
1853 establishments in Georgia (U.S. state)
Savannah Historic District